Mandarin Mix-Up is a 1924 American silent comedy film directed by Scott Pembroke and starring Stan Laurel.

Plot
Stan is the new baby in the family and is shown in a high chair playing with a ball. His big brother is angry that the baby is throwing food at him and ties him into a laundry bag.

He is taken to a Chinese laundry and the story jumps twenty years. The family has raised him as their son and call him Sum Sap. He has a very long pigtail. He angers a Tong gangster and is in fear of his life. Sap falls in love with a Chinese girl and pursues her in slow motion. He falls into the Buddhist temple and angers the men. A battle begins between the tongs. Stan appears in a police uniform and the street battle stops.

With his uniform on he refuses to pay for a hot dog and is rude to the stall owner. One of the men draws a knife on him. He goes into a costume shop and disguises himself. The gang member tells him how he is going to slit Sum Sap's throat.

Whilst talking to a real policeman someone tries to kill him by dropping a vase on his head. After a few more things are dropped. Lili gives him a pistol and he fires it into the firework shop which explodes.

He marries his Chinese girlfriend Lili (Julie Leonard). Just then, her real parents and want to take her away. A bill poster is handed to him saying that Roger Cresus has left Sun Sap a million dollars because he loved him like a son.

Cast
 Stan Laurel as Sum Sap
 Julie Leonard as China girl

See also
 List of American films of 1924

References

External links

1924 films
1924 short films
American silent short films
American black-and-white films
1924 comedy films
Films directed by Scott Pembroke
Silent American comedy films
American comedy short films
1920s American films